Martha Warren Beckwith (January 19, 1871 – January 28, 1959) was an American folklorist and ethnographer who was the first chair in folklore at any university or college in the U.S.

Early life and education
Beckwith was born in Wellesley Heights, Massachusetts to George Ely and Harriet Winslow (née Goodale) Beckwith, both schoolteachers, before the family moved to Maui, Hawaii, where they had relatives descended from early missionaries. There, Beckwith made friends with many locals including members of the wealthy Alexander family who later sponsored her folklore work, and she developed an early interest in Hawaiian folk dancing.

Beckwith graduated from Mount Holyoke College with a Bachelor of Science degree in 1893 and taught English at her alma mater, as well as at Elmira College,Vassar College, and Smith College. 

Her formal education in anthropology did not begin till the 1900s. In 1906, she obtained a Master of Arts degree in anthropology after studying under Franz Boas at Columbia University, and she received her Doctor of Philosophy from the same institution in 1918.

Career 
In 1920, Beckwith was appointed to the chair in Folklore at Vassar College, making her the first person to hold a chair in the field at any college or university in the United States. The chair was part of The Folklore Foundation, established at Vassar by an anonymous donation by the naturalist, Annie Alexander, who Beckwith knew from her childhood in Maui.

Beckwith became a full professor in 1929 and retired in 1938.

Research

Beckwith conducted research in a variety of European and Middle Eastern countries but her most extensive research focused on Hawaii, Jamaica, and the Sioux and Mandan-Hidatsa Native American Reservations in North Dakota and South Dakota where she was inducted into the Prairie Chicken Clan of the Mandan-Hidatsa.

Beckwith carried out fieldwork in Jamaica between 1919 and 1922. Her publications on Jamaican folklore often included details on music recorded by Helen H. Roberts, who accompanied Beckwith to Jamaica in 1920 and 1921. Beckwith's research in culminated in Black Roadways: A Study of Jamaican Folklife (1929), which was the subject of an extended review in the Journal of American Folklore by Melville J. Herskovits, and to which Beckwith responded. Although not an uncritical review, Herskovits - an anthropologist who specialised on Africa - praised Beckwith for her detailed descriptions of customs, so much so that "he felt able to identify some as not merely African in origin but specifically, say, as Yoruba or Ashanti".  

In 1926 Beckwith gathered folktales at the Pine Ridge Indian Reservation in South Dakota.  From 1926 to 1927, during a sabbatical year from Vassar, her fieldwork took her to Goa, where she worked among Portuguese settlers as part of travels that also took place in Italy, Greece, Palestine and Syria. Between 1932 and 1933 Beckwith served as president of the American Folklore Society. 

Beckwith's most recognised work was her studies of Hawaiian culture, including creation chants and myths and translations of 19th century Hawaiian writers such as Kepelino and Kamakau, on the later period of the Hawaiian monarchy. Her Hawaiian Mythology (1940) has been described as "representing more than thirty years of exhaustive research".

Later life 
Beckwith retired from Vassar in 1938 but continued to research and publish. Her last years focused on work pertaining to Hawaiian herbal remedies. She died on 28 January 1959 and is buried on Maui in Makawao Cemetery, which is also the final resting place of her parents, brother, sister, and childhood friend Annie Alexander.

Selected bibliography
 Beckwith, Martha W. (1916). "The Hawaiian Hula-Dance". The Journal of American Folklore. 29 (113): 409–412. doi:10.2307/534686. ISSN 0021-8715.
 Beckwith, Martha Warren (1922). Folk-Games of Jamaica (with music recorded in the field by Helen H. Roberts). Poughkeepsie, N. Y.: Vassar College. OCLC10555685.
 Beckwith, Martha Warren (1923). "Signs and Superstitions Collected from American College Girls". The Journal of American Folklore. 36 (139): 1–15. doi:10.2307/535105. ISSN 0021-8715.
 Beckwith, Martha Warren (1923). Christmas Mummings in Jamaica (with music recorded in the field by Helen H. Roberts). Poughkeepsie, N.Y.: Vassar College. OCLC 47059596.
 Beckwith, Martha Warren (1923). Polynesian Analogues to the Celtic Other-World and Fairy Mistress Themes. New Haven, C.T.: Yale University Press. OCLC16327978.
 Beckwith, Martha Warren (1924). Jamaica Anansi Stories (with music recorded in the field by Helen Roberts). New York: American Folklore Society. OCLC2322187.
 Beckwith, Martha Warren (1924). 'The English Ballad in Jamaica: A Note upon the Origin of the Ballad Form'. Publications of the Modern Language Association, 39(2), 455–483. https://doi.org/10.2307/457194
 Beckwith, Martha Warren (1925). Jamaica Proverbs. Poughkeepsie, N.Y.: Vassar College. OCLC 4513341.
 Beckwith, Martha Warren (1927). Notes on Jamaican Ethnobotany. Poughkeepsie, N.Y.: Vassar College. OCLC 18484068.
 Beckwith, Martha Warren (1928). Jamaica Folk-Lore (with music recorded in the field by Helen H. Roberts). New York: American Folk-Lore Society. OCLC 312470569.
 Beckwith, Martha Warren (1929). Black Roadways: A Study of Jamaican Folk Life. Chapel Hill: University of North Carolina Press. OCLC 870469911. 
 Beckwith, Martha Warren (1930). Myths and Hunting Stories of the Mandan and Hidatsa Sioux. Poughkeepsie, N.Y.: Vassar College. OCLC 3371330.
 Beckwith, Martha Warren (1930). "Mythology of the Oglala Dakota". The Journal of American Folklore. 43 (170): 339–442. doi:10.2307/535138. ISSN 0021-8715.
 Beckwith, Martha Warren (1937). Mandan-Hidatsa Myths and Ceremonies. New York: American Folk-Lore Society. OCLC 800851041.
 Beckwith, Martha Warren (1940). Hawaiian Mythology. New Haven, C.T.: Yale University Press, 1940. OCLC 316816993.
 Beckwith, Martha Warren (1948). "An Old Song". Western Folklore. 7 (2): 176–177. doi:10.2307/1497388. ISSN 0043-373X.
 Beckwith, Martha W. (1949). "Function and Meaning of the Kumulipo Birth Chant in Ancient Hawaii". The Journal of American Folklore. 62 (245): 290–293. doi:10.2307/537203. ISSN 0021-8715.
 Beckwith, Martha Warren (1951). The Kumulipo: A Hawaiian Creation Chant. Chicago: University of Chicago Press, 1951. OCLC 898842854.

References

External links
 
 
 Books by Martha Warren Beckwith at the Online Books Page, University of Pennsylvania Library.
 Hawaiian Mythology by Martha Warren Beckwith (digitized text at Sacred Texts Archive)
 The Kumulipo, a Hawaiian Creation Chant by Martha Warren Beckwith (digitized text at Sacred Texts Archive)
 Jamaica Anansi Stories by Martha Warren Beckwith (digitized text at Sacred Texts Archive)

1871 births
1959 deaths
American folklorists
Women folklorists
American ethnographers
Mount Holyoke College alumni
American anthropologists
American women anthropologists
Vassar College faculty
Smith College faculty
Columbia Graduate School of Arts and Sciences alumni
Place of death missing
American women non-fiction writers
American women academics
Presidents of the American Folklore Society